Hanna  is a village in Włodawa County, Lublin Voivodeship, in eastern Poland, close to the border with Belarus. It is the seat of the gmina (administrative district) called Gmina Hanna.

The village has a population of 790.

References

Villages in Włodawa County